Arnaud Le Lan (born 22 March 1978 in Pontivy, France), is a football defender who last played for FC Lorient. He played his entire career in Brittany.

Club career
Le Lan started his professional footballing career with Ligue 1 club FC Lorient in 1996. He stayed there until 2002 playing 100 games for the clubs. Whilst at Lorient Le Lan played in the 2002 Coupe de France Final in which they beat SC Bastia.

In 2002, he signed for Stade Rennais FC.

In 2005, he signed for En Avant Guingamp for a fee worth €500K. He played 87 games for the club.

In 2008, he rejoined his first football club FC Lorient.

He retired at the end of the 2012–13 Ligue 1 with FC Lorient, at the age of 35

Honours
FC Lorient
Coupe de France: 2001–02

References

External links

 
 
 

1978 births
Living people
People from Pontivy
French footballers
Ligue 1 players
Ligue 2 players
FC Lorient players
Stade Rennais F.C. players
En Avant Guingamp players
Association football defenders
Sportspeople from Morbihan
Footballers from Brittany
Rennes 2 University alumni
Brittany international footballers